Ultimate Hits is a greatest hits compilation by Australian rock group Little River Band, released on 14 October 2022. It comprises the band's singles between 1975 and 1986, all remastered for this release. The album debuted at number 29 on the ARIA Charts.

Track listing 
CD1
 "It's a Long Way There" – 8:42
 "Curiosity (Killed the Cat)" – 3:43
 "I'll Always Call Your Name" – 4:51
 "Emma" – 3:28
 "Everyday of My Life" – 3:51
 "Help Is on Its Way" – 3:57
 "Witchery" – 2:51
 "Home on Monday" – 3:54
 "Happy Anniversary" – 4:02
 "Shut Down Turn Off" – 3:54
 "Reminiscing" – 4:28
 "Lady" – 4:49

CD2
 "Lonesome Loser" – 3:59
 "Cool Change" – 5:13
 "It's Not a Wonder" – 3:59
 "I'm Coming Home" – 3:45
 "The Night Owls" – 5:22
 "Take It Easy on Me" – 3:48
 "Man on Your Mind" – 4:17
 "Down on the Border" – 2:56
 "The Other Guy" – 2:50
 "We Two" – 4:33
 "You're Driving Me Out of My Mind" – 5:14
 "Playing to Win" – 2:59
 "Forever Blue" – 5:08

Charts

Release history

References 

2022 greatest hits albums
Little River Band albums
Compilation albums by Australian artists
Universal Records compilation albums